Bradley James Sherman (born October 24, 1954) is an American accountant and politician serving as the U.S. representative for California's 32nd congressional district. A member of the Democratic Party, he first entered Congress in 1997; Sherman represented California's 24th congressional district for three terms, California's 27th congressional district for five terms, and California's 30th congressional district for five terms. His district is in the San Fernando Valley, in Los Angeles County, as well as the eastern part of the Simi Hills in Ventura County. He resides in Sherman Oaks.

Early life, education, and early career
Sherman was born in Los Angeles, the son of Lane (from the Philadelphia area) and Maurice Hyman Sherman (from Indiana). His parents were both of Russian Jewish descent. He attended Mark Keppel High School and Corona del Mar High School. He received a B.A. in political science from University of California, Los Angeles, in 1974, and a J.D. magna cum laude from Harvard Law School in 1979. He is also a tax law specialist and Certified Public Accountant. Before joining Congress, Sherman worked at one of the nations' big-four CPA firms, participated in audits of large businesses and governmental entities as a staff member, provided tax law counsel on multi-million-dollar transactions, advised entrepreneurs and small businesses on tax and investment issues, and helped represent the Philippine government under Corazon Aquino in a successful effort to seize assets of deposed president Ferdinand Marcos. Sherman was also an instructor at Harvard Law School's International Tax Program.

Board of Equalization (1991–1996)
Sherman served on the California State Board of Equalization from 1991 to 1996. He chaired the board from 1991 to 1995.

It was reported that the campaign for the Board of Equalization involved numerous attacks. Claude Parrish, Sherman's opponent, said that an attorney general candidate declined to endorse Sherman due to a post on the state's elected tax appeals board. Sherman replied, calling it "one of the most outrageous hit pieces in contemporary California political history".

U.S. House of Representatives

Elections

In 1994, incumbent Democratic U.S. Representative Anthony C. Beilenson of California's 24th congressional district barely survived the Republican Revolution, winning reelection by a two-point margin, by far the worst election performance of his career. In 1996, Beilenson decided to retire.

Sherman ran for the seat and won the seven-candidate Democratic primary with 54% of the vote. In the general election, he defeated Republican nominee Rich Sybert (also the 1994 nominee), 49%–44%. He has not faced another contest nearly that close since. In 1998, he was reelected with 57% of the vote. Since then, he has been reelected every two years with at least 62%.

2012 

Redistricting following the 2010 census drew the homes of Sherman and fellow Democrat Howard Berman, who had previously represented the 28th district, into the 30th district. The redrawn 30th was more Sherman's district than Berman's; Sherman retained approximately 60% of his former territory, while Berman retained 20% of his former voters. On June 5, 2012, Sherman faced Berman in the primary for the 30th district. Sherman finished first, leading 42% to 32%. Due to California's new election system, which put the two candidates who received the most votes in the primary against each other, regardless of party, the two faced each other again in the general election. Neither candidate was endorsed by the state Democratic Party.

Berman was the more established candidate. He was endorsed by over 20 congressmen, including party leaders Steny Hoyer and Xavier Becerra, and by sitting Governor Jerry Brown, sitting Los Angeles Mayor Antonio Villaraigosa, and the state's two U.S. senators, Barbara Boxer and Dianne Feinstein. He was also endorsed by ten Republican congressmen from California: David Dreier, Wally Herger, Dan Lungren, Elton Gallegly, Buck McKeon, Ed Royce, Jerry Lewis, Ken Calvert, Mary Bono Mack, and Darrell Issa. In addition, he was endorsed by two Republican U.S. senators, John McCain and Lindsey Graham, and by Independent U.S. senator Joe Lieberman.

Sherman was endorsed by then-lieutenant governor (and future governor) Gavin Newsom, former president Bill Clinton, and former Massachusetts governor Michael Dukakis.

In the general election, Sherman defeated Berman, 60%–40%.

Tenure 
First elected to the United States House of Representatives in 1996, Sherman is serving his 12th term in Congress. He is a senior member of the House Foreign Affairs Committee, and serves as the top Democrat on the Subcommittee on Asia. He is chairman emeritus of the Subcommittee on International Terrorism, Non-Proliferation, and Trade. He is also a senior member of the Financial Services Committee.

Sherman has held over 160 Town Hall meetings since being elected to Congress. In the Washingtonian's 2012 anonymous survey of congressional staff, Sherman was named the second-meanest member of the House, after Sheila Jackson Lee.

Environment

Sherman has earned a 100% rating from the Sierra Club and the League of Conservation Voters.

Serving on the House Budget Committee in 1997, Sherman authored the Sherman Amendment to the Budget Resolution, providing an additional $700 million for the acquisition of environmentally important lands in FY 1998.

Labor
Sherman's voting record has most often earned him a 100% rating from the AFL–CIO, the Service Employees International Union (SEIU), and the American Federation of State, County, & Municipal Employees (AFSCME).

Sherman was an original co-sponsor of The Employee Free Choice Act when it was introduced at the start of 2007 and when it was reintroduced in 2009.

In 2008 and 2010, Sherman introduced legislation to eliminate so-called state "Right to Work" laws nationwide, and he supports a single national standard that protects labor rights. Sherman has also opposed Free Trade deals with South Korea, Colombia, and other countries, because he believes they are bad for American workers.

Transportation
Sherman has worked to reduce airport noise in the San Fernando Valley. He joined several colleagues in introducing legislation, the Valley-Wide Noise Relief Act, to allow the operator of Bob Hope Airport to implement a mandatory nighttime curfew.

Sherman secured federal funds to initiate several improvements at the 101/405 interchange.

Animal rights
Sherman's voting record has earned him a 100% rating in 2004 from the Humane Society, which has awarded him the "Humane Champion" award for five consecutive years.

In 2017 and 2018, the Animal Welfare Institute gave Sherman a rating of 68%, based on congressional voting records.

Fiscal policy
Sherman "led the House revolt" against the original $700 billion bailout plan, known as the Troubled Asset Relief Program (TARP). He introduced the "Too Big to Fail, Too Big to Exist Act", with regard to large financial entities.

In 2010, Sherman received a 61% rating from the Chamber of Commerce and a 55% rating from the National Federation of Independent Business.

In 2018, the Chamber of Commerce gave Sherman a 55% rating on issues relating to budget, spending, and taxes, and a 41% rating on issues relating to businesses and consumers.

Financial crisis
During the debate over the Emergency Economic Stabilization Act of 2008 (commonly known as "the bailout of the U.S. financial system"), Sherman was an early and outspoken critic of the proposal, leading the House revolt against the bill, a move that made him "spectacularly unpopular with both the Republican and Democratic leaderships, not to mention K Street". He argued that Bush and his advisors had created a panic atmosphere in an effort to get lawmakers to rubber-stamp the bill.

Social Security and health care
Sherman has said he is "opposed to creating a voucher system for Medicare". He wants to avoid "turn[ing] Social Security into a welfare program", instead keeping it "for people who contribute to it".

For his voting record and efforts in Congress, Sherman has consistently earned a 100% rating from the National Committee to Preserve Social Security and Medicare and the AARP. He supports the Patient Protection and Affordable Care Act.

Sherman helped secure funds to develop a new women's and children's patient wing at El Proyecto del Barrio's Family Health Care Clinic in Winnetka.

Housing
Sherman introduced the Preserving Equal Access to Mortgage Finance Programs Act (HR 1754), which raises the conforming loan limit for FHA loans in high-cost areas such as Sherman's district.

Sherman frequently holds seminars for Valley residents in his district, to address issues of home purchasing, home refinancing, and foreclosure avoidance.

Civil liberties
Sherman's legislative record received a 100% rating from the American Civil Liberties Union (ACLU) in 2011, a 100% from the National Organization for Women (NOW) in 2007–08, a 100% from the Human Rights Campaign in 2009–10, and a 98% rating from the NAACP in 2009–10.

Sherman co-sponsored the Due Process Guarantee Act, which amends the Non-Detention Act of 1971 to provide that Congressional authorization of the use of military force does not authorize the indefinite detention without charge or trial of U.S. citizens.

In 2011, Sherman voted against reauthorizing the Patriot Act because of concerns that it would infringe on certain civil liberties, including the "library provision" that allows the FBI to acquire records about what books a person has checked out from libraries.

Foreign relations
In August 2010, Sherman introduced legislation aimed at rescinding China's Most Favored Nation status as long as there was not "a more level playing field between our two nations". He said, "the U.S.-China trade relationship is horrendously lopsided".

Sherman has introduced or co-sponsored more than 20 bills in the 111th and 112th Congresses that he says "enact tougher sanctions to isolate Iran economically and diplomatically". His efforts have included legislation designed to close loopholes for U.S. companies with subsidiaries operating in Iran, and to curtail U.S. funding of international organizations providing loans to Iran.

Sherman has been a strong supporter and advocate of the U.S-Israel relationship, consistently supporting aid to Israel. In 2016, he called the American Israel Public Affairs Committee (AIPAC), Washington's chief pro-Israel lobbying and advocacy organization, "the single most important organization in promoting the U.S.-Israel alliance". In 2004, Sherman first introduced the U.S.-Israel Energy Cooperation Act. It provides grants to joint ventures between American and Israeli academics and private companies that conduct research and develop energy-efficient and renewable energy technologies.

On July 9, 2014, Sherman appeared as a guest commentator on the Al Jazeera America's network. During his appearance, he criticized the network's Qatar-based owners for funding Hamas. Sherman said: "Every one of those rockets [fired by Hamas into Israeli cities] is a war crime, almost every one. Of course it's a war crime committed by Hamas. And of course the owners of this TV network help fund Hamas." Sherman emphasized that Hamas often aims attacks at civilian targets. The Qatari government owns Al Jazeera.

In December 2014, Sherman and Representative Pete Roskam requested new sanctions on Qatar in a letter to Secretary of Treasury Jack Lew. They also asked for a detailed accounting of public and private financing from within Qatar for Hamas, Al-Qaeda, the Islamic State, and the al-Nusra Front.

Sherman and other pro-Israel members of Congress have introduced legislation to allow Israel to be part of the visa waiver program. The legislation failed because the Israeli government was unwilling to grant reciprocal visa-free travel for all U.S. citizens.

As a senior member of the House Committee on Foreign Affairs, Sherman has focused on Congressional recognition of the Armenian genocide, as well as increasing funding to Armenia and Nagorno-Karabakh, which is officially part of Azerbaijan, but has been under control of ethnic Armenian forces backed by Armenia since the end of a separatist war in 1994. He called for the imposition of sanctions against Azerbaijan.

Sherman urged the Trump administration to take a tougher line on China by imposing sanctions on Chinese officials who are responsible for human rights abuses against the Uyghur Muslim minority in China's Xinjiang region. In March 2019, Sherman and other lawmakers wrote Secretary of State Mike Pompeo a letter that read in part, "This issue is bigger than just China. It is about demonstrating to strongmen globally that the world will hold them accountable for their actions."

Religion
Sherman and his wife, who are Jewish, have been members of Valley Beth Shalom, a conservative synagogue in Encino, California, for many years.

As a congressman, Sherman has appeared at events sponsored by virtually every religious denomination practiced in America – including Orthodox Jewish, Reform Jewish, Conservative Jewish, Reconstructionist Jewish, Traditional Persian Jewish, Sephardic Jewish, Scientologist, Muslim, Catholic, Roman Catholic, Coptic Christian, The Assyrian Church, Greek Orthodox, the Armenian Church, Sikh, Buddhist, Hindu, Russian Orthodox, the Hungarian reformed Orthodox Church, Episcopalian, Methodist, Presbyterian, the Church of Christ, nondenominational Christian, and evangelical Christian.

Sherman expressed condolences to the Sikh community after the deadly shootings at a Sikh temple in August 2012. After the September 11 attacks, Sherman joined colleagues in introducing a resolution to condemn bigotry and violence against Sikh-Americans. He has advocated on behalf of religious minorities outside the U.S., including Hindus in Pakistan and Christians and Jews in the Arab world. Sherman introduced the Religious Minorities in the Arab World Resolution, which calls for the protection of the rights and freedoms of ethno-religious minorities, particularly in Egypt and Iraq.

Internet policy
In 2011, Sherman co-sponsored SOPA, a controversial copyright bill. His 2012 opponent, Howard Berman, was an original co-sponsor of SOPA.

Cryptocurrency

On March 14, 2018, Sherman made highly critical remarks about Bitcoin, cryptocurrency, and initial coin offerings. He started his prepared remarks by saying, "Cryptocurrencies are a crock". He further said, on Congressional record, that all Bitcoin does is allow "a few dozen men in my district to sit in their pajamas on their couch all day and tell their wives they are going to be millionaires". He further suggested that Bitcoin provides no value to the real economy, asking: "When you buy a Bitcoin, are you helping build a new factory?" On July 18, 2018, Sherman called for a ban on dealing in or mining of cryptocurrencies by U.S. persons and said that use of cryptocurrencies as a medium of exchange is useful only to people facilitating narcotics trafficking, terrorism, and tax evasion.

LGBT
Sherman strongly supports LGBT rights. He earned a 100% rating from the Human Rights Campaign, the nation's largest LGBT rights group, in the 114th, 113th, and 112th Congresses.

Sherman is a member of the LGBT Equality Caucus and supports same-sex marriage. He voted for the Don't Ask, Don't Tell Repeal Act of 2010.

Sherman was an original co-sponsor of Representative Jared Polis's Student Non-Discrimination Act. Sherman is also a co-sponsor of the Employment Non-Discrimination Act. In 2009, he voted for the Matthew Shepard and James Byrd, Jr., Hate Crimes Prevention Act, which imposes additional federal penalties for crimes motivated by hatred on the basis of race, religion, or actual or perceived sexual orientation.

Abortion
Sherman is pro-choice. He earned a 100% rating from NARAL and Planned Parenthood in 2009. Sherman opposed the overturning of Roe v. Wade, calling it "appalling and outrageous."

Gun control
Sherman has worked to expand the definition of armor-piercing ammunition. He sponsored the Protect Law Enforcement Armor (PLEA) Act. Sherman has received a 100% rating from the Brady Campaign to Prevent Gun Violence.

International trade
Sherman opposed the North American Free Trade Agreement (NAFTA) and the Central American Free Trade Agreement (CAFTA), arguing that they cost American jobs, fail to protect foreign workers, harm the environment, and cost U.S. taxpayers billions of dollars. He has also opposed a Free Trade Agreement with South Korea, arguing that such an agreement could undermine U.S. security and economic interests by benefiting China and North Korea.

Education
Sherman has earned a 100% rating from the California Teachers Association, the National Education Association, and the American Federation of Teachers.

Office environment
In December 2017, eight former aides to Sherman said that his offices in Washington, D. C., and California had a toxic environment characterized by frequent "verbal abuse from the congressman and senior staff that made them feel bullied and demoralized". A focus of the criticism was Matt Dababneh, Sherman's district director and a close advisor, who began working for Sherman in 2005, and became district director to Sherman in 2009. Dababneh was elected to the California State Assembly in 2013 and resigned from that body after allegations of sexual assault and other misconduct were made against him. Former employees in Sherman's office told the Los Angeles Times that Dababneh frequently made inappropriate sexual remarks, including degrading and sexist comments, and bragged about his sexual exploits. No one suggested that Sherman knew of Dababneh's conduct, but several staffers said that the office environment did not encourage reporting and that Sherman would not have been receptive to complaints about a trusted advisor.

Sherman has acknowledged being "a demanding boss" but "denied that his management style contributed to the silence about Dababneh's behavior". Surveys of Capitol Hill staff rated Sherman as one of the worst members of Congress to work for, with high staff turnover rates.

In January 2018, Sherman held a town hall meeting in Reseda, where a questioner who supported a Democratic primary challenger to Sherman accused Sherman of having an inadequate sexual harassment policy. Sherman replied: "We have five different ways to report sexual harassment in my office. One among those is to talk to me personally. And I talk to each staff member several times a year about the office policy." The exchange was cut from a video of the event that Sherman's office posted to YouTube; the office said that it excluded from the highlight reel "all questions asked by a questioner working with an opponent's campaign if the questioner failed to disclose that fact in their question".

Impeachment 
On July 12, 2017, Sherman introduced an Article of Impeachment (H. Res. 438) against President Donald J. Trump for High Crimes and Misdemeanors on the grounds that Trump attempted to obstruct justice by firing James Comey from the F.B.I. Sherman had only one co-sponsor, Al Green, who first called for Trump's impeachment in May 2017.

Committee assignments
 Committee on Financial Services
United States House Financial Services Subcommittee on Investor Protection, Entrepreneurship, and Capital Markets, Chairman
 United States House Financial Services Subcommittee on Housing, Community Development, and Insurance
 United States House Financial Services Subcommittee on Consumer Protection and Financial Institutions
 Committee on Foreign Affairs
Subcommittee on Asia, the Pacific, and Non-Proliferation 
 United States House Foreign Affairs Subcommittee on International Development, International Organizations, and Global Corporate Social Impact 
 United States House Foreign Affairs Subcommittee on Middle East, North Africa, and Global Counter-Terrorism  
 Committee on Science, Space, and Technology 
 United States House Science Subcommittee Subcommittee on Space and Aeronautics

Caucus memberships
Congressional Progressive Caucus
Israel Allies Caucus (co-chair)
Congressional Sindh Caucus (chair)
 House Baltic Caucus
Congressional Arts Caucus
Congressional Asian Pacific American Caucus

Personal life
On December 3, 2006, Sherman married Lisa Nicola Kaplan, a foreign affairs officer for the U.S. State Department. The couple's first child, Molly Hannah Sherman, was born on January 14, 2009. Their second, Naomi Claire Sherman, was born on February 6, 2010. Their third, Lucy Rayna Sherman, was born on August 8, 2011.

See also
 List of Jewish members of the United States Congress

References

External links

 Congressman Brad Sherman official U.S. House website
 Brad Sherman for Congress campaign website 
 
 

|-

|-

|-

|-

|-

1954 births
20th-century American politicians
21st-century American politicians
American people of Russian-Jewish descent
California lawyers
Harvard Law School alumni
Jewish members of the United States House of Representatives
Living people
Democratic Party members of the United States House of Representatives from California
People from Monterey Park, California
People from Sherman Oaks, Los Angeles
Politicians from Los Angeles
University of California, Los Angeles alumni
21st-century American Jews
American Jews from California